Alexander Beleschenko  (born 1951) is a British artist working in glass who creates architectural glass installations.

Biography 
Alexander Beleschenko was born in Corby, Northamptonshire to Ukrainian parents. He initially studied painting at Winchester School of Art 1969-72  and printmaking at the Slade School of Fine Art, London 1973–75. After winning the John Brinkley Fellowship at Norwich School of Art and time spent living in Florence, he went on to study Architectural Stained Glass at Swansea School of Art, 1978–79.

Alexander Beleschenko's works include the cone wall in Southwark tube station in London,  the Heart of Wales in the Senedd Welsh Assembly Building in Cardiff, the façade portal doors for Herz Jesu Kirche in Munich and glazed facades for the Forum Building, University of Exeter.

Alexander Beleschenko has twice been awarded  the Art and Architecture Award from the Royal Society of Arts. He is a Fellow of the Royal Society of Arts, an Honorary Fellow of the Royal Institute of British Architects, an Honorary Fellow of Swansea Metropolitan University and an Honorary Doctor of the University of Exeter

He lives and works in Swansea.

Selected Projects 
 2022 Members' room, Chartered Accountants' Hall, London
 2015 Swimming pool, spa area wall, Holland Green Spa, London
 2014 Entrance screen, Torquay House, London
 2012 Entrance reception area screens, Landmark Tower, Abu Dhabi
 2011 Glazed facades, University of Exeter
 2011 Entrance reception area wall, Baker Street, London
 2010 Entrance level access to building, Glass Tower, Neuenbeken, Germany
 2010 Glass façade, Kendrew Quad Café, St John's College, Oxford (link)
 2010 Glass façade, Blackhall Road, St John's College, Oxford
 2009 Entrance façades, Templeback, Bristol
 2008 Glass columns in atrium area, Cruise ship, ‘Solstice’
 2008 Facade glass, The Quad Arts Centre, Derby
 2008 Atrium glass wall, Fitzrovia, London
 2007 Glass canopies, phase 2, Washington Square, Workington
 2006 Pulpitum screen, Ewenny Priory, Bridgend, Wales
 2006 Glass canopies, phase 1, Washington Square, Workington
 2006 Floor piece, Senedd Cymru, Cardiff, Wales
 2005 Screen, Royal London Hospital, London
 2005 Screens (Collaboration with Raffaella Sirtoli), Trinity Church in the City of Boston, Boston, USA
 2004 Sculptures The Met Office, Exeter
 2004 External wall panels, Princes Street, London
 2004 Entrance Lobby artwork (Collaboration with Bruce MacLean), Hanover Street, London
 2003 Frieze.Queen Victoria Street, London
 2003 Bridge balustrades, Millennium Place, Coventry
 2002 Canary Wharf B1 Corridor glass walls, Canary Wharf, London
 2002 Link glass walls, Canary Wharf, London
 2000 Façade portal doors., Herz Jesu Kirche, Munich, Germany
 2000 Stairwell balustrades, The Lighthouse, Glasgow
 1998 Cone wall, Intermediate Concourse, Southwark tube station, London
 1997 Windows, Prayer Rooms, Neue Messe, Munich
 1995 Windows, Galton Bridge Station, Birmingham
 1995 Windows, Jewellery Quarter Bridge Station, Birmingham
 1993 Atrium Screens, Garden Quad, St John's College, Oxford
 1992 Windows, County Council Offices, Winchester
 1992 Suspended panels, Church of Christ the Cornerstone, Milton Keynes
 1991 Suspended work, Birmingham International Convention Centre, Birmingham
 1988 Suspended work, County Hall, Chelmsford, Essex
 1986 Window, Stockley Park, Outer London

References 

1951 births
Living people
People from Corby
British people of Ukrainian descent
Alumni of the Slade School of Fine Art
Alumni of Norwich University of the Arts
Alumni of the University of Southampton
Artists from Swansea
British glass artists